The Janus laser was a (then considered high power) two beam infrared neodymium doped silica glass laser built at Lawrence Livermore National Laboratory in 1974 for the study of inertial confinement fusion. Janus was built using about 100 pounds of Nd:glass laser material. Initially, Janus was only capable of producing laser pulses of about 10 joules of energy at a power of 0.5TW.  It was the first laser at Livermore to generate thermonuclear fusion via the irradiation of DT gas filled glass ("exploding pusher") targets.

See also
 Laser
 Lawrence Livermore National Laboratory
 List of laser articles
 List of laser types

External links
 https://web.archive.org/web/20041109063036/http://www.llnl.gov/50science/lasers.html
 http://www.osti.gov/bridge/servlets/purl/16710-UOC0xx/native/16710.pdf
 http://adsabs.harvard.edu/cgi-bin/nph-bib_query?bibcode=1978SPIE..121..111G&db_key=PHY&data_type=HTML&format=&high=44fac4eeaa10084
 https://ieeexplore.ieee.org/document/1072443

Inertial confinement fusion research lasers